Andrew Naylor (born 12 August 1965) is a British former pair skater. With his skating partner, Cheryl Peake, he became a six-time British national champion. The pair finished 12th at the 1988 Winter Olympics in Calgary, Alberta, Canada. Other notable results for the pair included fifth-place finishes at the European Figure Skating Championships in 1987 and 1989, and a ninth place at the 1987 World Championships. Before his partnership with Peake, Naylor competed with Maxine Hague.

Results

With Peake

With Hague

References

External links 
 

British male pair skaters
English male pair skaters
1965 births
Olympic figure skaters of Great Britain
Figure skaters at the 1988 Winter Olympics
Living people
Sportspeople from Nottingham